Varuna (or Varunna) was launched at Calcutta in 1796. She made four voyages as an "extra ship" for the British East India Company (EIC), and then spent two years as a troopship. She returned to India in 1806. She was lost in 1811, probably in a typhoon.

Career
EIC voyage #1 (1796–1797): Captain Henry Mathias Elmore sailed from Saugor on 31 May 1796, bound for England. Varuna was at Pondicherry on 6 July and reached St Helena on 11 October. She left there on 13 November and reached Bristol on 14 January 1797. She left Bristol on 10 March and arrived at The Downs on 25 March.

Varuna was admitted to the Registry of Great Britain on 11 May 1797. She then made three more voyages for the EIC after having undergone repairs by Barnard. She entered Lloyd's Register in 1797 (published in 1796), with H. Elmore, master, Princep & Co. owners, and trade London−Bengal.

EIC voyage #2 (1797–1799): The EIC chartered Varunna for one voyage at a rate of £24/ton for 550 measured tons, and £12/ton for surplus. Captain Elmore sailed from London on 5 July, and from Torbay on 22 September 1797, bound for Bengal and Madras. Varuna reached the Cape of Good Hope on 22 December and departed on 19 February 1798. She arrived at Diamond Harbour on 4 May. On his arrival at Calcutta Captain Elmore retired.

Homeward bound, she departed Kedgeree on 21 September and reached Madras on 13 October. She was at the Cape on 3 January 1799, reached St Helena on 9 February, which she left on 9 May, and arrived at The Downs on 13 July.

Varuna sailed from London on 20 November 1799 bound for Madras and Bengal with a cargo £45,000 declared value.

EIC voyage #3 (1800–1801): Captain William Ward Farrer sailed from Bengal in 1800, bound for England. Varuna left Saugor on 11 December 1800, reached the Cape on 15 February 1801 and St Helena on 7 March, and arrived at The Downs on 29 May.

The convoy also brought with it Colonel Robert Brooke, The former governor of St Helena. Varuna sailed back to Calcutta on 24 August 1801.

Varuna sailed from Portsmouth on 9 September 1801, bound for Bengal. The convoy reached Madeira on 23 September, and left the next day.

EIC voyage #4 (1803): Captain John Lowe sailed from Kedgeree on 19 February 1803, bound for England. Varuna  reached St Helena on 19 May. She arrived at the River Shannon on 26 July and left on 14 August. She arrived at the Downs on 24 August.

Subsequent career
Between 1803 and 1805 Varuna served the Transport Board as a troopship.

The Register of Shipping for 1806 (published in 1805), gives the name of Varunas master and owner as Dennison, and her trade as London–India. Captain Edward Stephenson Dennison acquired a letter of marque on 28 June 1805. He then sailed from London on 4 July, bound for India.

Varuna was one of the EIC vessels that were part of the expedition under General Sir David Baird and Admiral Sir Home Riggs Popham that would in 1806 capture the Dutch Cape Colony. They would carry supplies and troops to the Cape, and then continue on their voyages.

King George was unable to tack and wrecked. She then drifted on to the atoll where she lost her rudder and bilged.

At St Salvador Bay Biard hired her to take on board some of the crew and troops from Britannia  and King George.

The British fleet, including Varuna, arrived in Table Bay on 5 January 1806 and anchored off Robben Island. The military and naval commanders paid the Government in Bengal £3370 for beer taken out of Varuna and issued to the King's ships.

Fate
Varuna appears to have sailed as a country ship, i.e., in the East Indies and possibly to China, after her return to India.

Varuna arrived in Calcutta on 9 October 1806 from Penang, having sailed from there on 4 October. She carried Captain Forest, whose ship  had wrecked at New Guinea.

An 1809 listing of vessels belonging to Bombay lists Varuna. with George Douglas, master, and Bruce, Fawcett, and Co., owners.

Varuna, Douglas, master, appears in a list of country ships lost in the India and China Seas. Varuna was lost in the China Seas in 1811, presumed to have foundered in a typhoon.

Notes

Citations

References
 

 
 
Reports and Papers on the Impolicy of Employing Indian Built Ships in the Trade of the East-India Company, and of Admitting Them to British Registry: With Observation on Its Injurious Consequences to the Landed and Shipping Interests, and to the Numerous Branches of Trade Dependent on the Building and Equipment of British-built Ships (1814). (Blacks and Parry).
 
 

1796 ships
British ships built in India
Age of Sail merchant ships of England
Ships of the British East India Company
Maritime incidents in 1811
Missing ships
Ships lost with all hands
Shipwrecks